The Benthobiidae is a taxonomic family of sea snails, marine gastropod molluscs in the superfamily Olivoidea.

Genera
Genera within the family Benthobiidae include:
 Benthobia Dall, 1889
 Fusulculus Bouchet & Vermeij, 1998

Genera brought into synonymy:
 Nux Barnard, 1960: synonym of Benthobia Dall, 1889

References

External links
 Kantor Yu.I., Fedosov A.E., Puillandre N., Bonillo C. & Bouchet P. (2017). Returning to the roots: morphology, molecular phylogeny and classification of the Olivoidea (Gastropoda: Neogastropoda). Zoological Journal of the Linnean Society. 180(3): 493-541

 
Olivoidea
Gastropod families